Ronald Holassie (born July 29, 1971 in Port of Spain) is a male long-distance runner from Trinidad and Tobago, who twice competed for his native country at the Summer Olympics: 1996 and 2000. He set his personal best (2:13:03) in the marathon on April 29, 2001 in Jacksonville, breaking the national record.

International competitions

References

sports-reference

1971 births
Living people
Sportspeople from Port of Spain
Trinidad and Tobago male long-distance runners
Olympic athletes of Trinidad and Tobago
Athletes (track and field) at the 1996 Summer Olympics
Athletes (track and field) at the 2000 Summer Olympics
Commonwealth Games competitors for Trinidad and Tobago
Athletes (track and field) at the 2002 Commonwealth Games
World Athletics Championships athletes for Trinidad and Tobago